Sovetabad, Azerbaijan may refer to:

 Sovetabad, Babek, Nakhchivan
 Arpaçay, Azerbaijan, Nakhchivan
 Şuraabad, Khizi